Mariage may refer to:
 Mariage (card game), a European card game with bonuses for "marrying" king and queen of the same suit
 Mariage (film), a 1974 film by Claude Lelouch
 Mariage, a 2009 album by Kadril

See also
 Marriage (disambiguation)